PYP may refer to:

 Portland Youth Philharmonic, a youth orchestra in Portland, Oregon
 IB Primary Years Programme, a program developed by the International Baccalaureate for students between kindergarten and 5th grade in the United States
 Centre–Piedmont–Cherokee County Regional Airport (FAA LID: PYP), an airport near Centre, Alabama